Yoav Talmi  (born April 28, 1943,  is an Israeli conductor and composer.

Biography
Yoav Talmi was  born in Kibbutz Merhavia He studied composition and orchestral direction first in Israel, at the Rubin Academy of Music, later renamed The Buchmann-Mehta School of Music in Tel Aviv, and then in the United States, at the Juilliard School.  In 1966, he was awarded the Koussevitzky Conducting Prize at the Tanglewood Music Center. In 1973, he won the Rupert Foundation Conducting Competition in London.

Yoav Talmi is married to Er'ella, once a flutist and today an author of children's books and adults novels. They have two children and three grandchildren.  In 2001, the Université Laval awarded him an honorary doctorate. In 2009, he was made an Officer of the National Order of Quebec. He is a winner of the 2013 Israeli Prime Minister's Prize for Composers.

Music career
Talmi was music director of the Arnhem Philharmonic from 1974 to 1980. Between 1977 and 1979 he served as the Principal Guest Conductor of the Munich Philharmonic and From 1984 to 1988, he was music director of the Israel Chamber Orchestra (ICO) and the Israeli Opera, and later held the title of principal guest conductor with the ICO.  Talmi served as music director of the San Diego Symphony from 1987 to 1996, and made several recordings with them for the Naxos label.  He was artistic director and Principal Conductor of l'Orchestre Symphonique de Québec (Québec Symphony Orchestra) from 1998 to 2011, and now has the title of conductor emeritus of the orchestra.  He was Chief Conductor of the Hamburg Symphony Orchestra from 2000 to 2004. In February 2013, Talmi returned to the ICO as its music director, a post he held until 2015.

Talmi's compositions include the official march of the Israeli Army, Tsahal Tso'ed, an Elegy for Strings, Timpani and Accordion ("Dachau Reflections"). His composition "De Profundis for Choir and Orchestra" premiered in Quebec City in May 2011. His "Animi Motus" For Children's (or Women) Choir was premiered by the Jerusalem Symphony in 2015. A Clarinet Quintet (2017) and many other compositions and arrangements. 
Talmi is the head of the conducting department at The Buchmann-Mehta School of Music. Tel Aviv University. His compositions are published by the Israel Music institute (IMI), Kalmus Edition USA, Carl Fischer Music, Broekmans en van Poppel, Amsterdam and Les Production d'Oz, Canada.

See also
Music of Israel

References

External links 
 Yoav Talmi's official website
 Yoav Talmi's General Management Schmidt Artists International
 Lucie Renaud, "Yoav Talmi - The Knight of the Rose". La Scena Musicale, 2 October 2002.
 Bach Cantatas.com biography of Yoav Talmi
 https://forward.com/schmooze/144656/conductor-yoav-talmi-is-marching-to-glory/

1943 births
Living people
Israeli conductors (music)
Israeli composers
Officers of the National Order of Quebec
21st-century conductors (music)
Centaur Records artists